Habitation de Québec was an ensemble of buildings interconnected by Samuel de Champlain when he founded Québec during 1608. The site is located in what is now Vieux-Québec. It was located near the site of the abandoned First Nations village of Stadacona that Jacques Cartier had visited during 1535. It served as a fort and as dwellings for the new colony in New France.

References 

History of Quebec City
Buildings and structures in Quebec City